The Lessing Monument (German: Lessing-Denkmal) is a monument to Gotthold Ephraim Lessing by Otto Lessing, installed at Tiergarten in Berlin, Germany.

See also

 List of works by Otto Lessing

External links
 

Statues in Berlin
Outdoor sculptures in Berlin
Sculptures of men in Germany
Statues in Germany
Tiergarten (park)